Mary Farnham Miller ( – ) was an American botanist who specialized in bryology, the study of moss and lichen.  She was one of the earliest members of the Sullivant Moss Society, and worked at the Smithsonian National Museum of Natural History.

Early life and education 

Career 

Mary Farnham Miller was elected secretary of the Sullivant Moss Society and served from 1904 to 1905. She also was in charge of the Lichen Department of the organization under the guidance of Carolyn Wilson Harris starting in March 1908. She worked on mosses and lichens for the National Museum of Natural History in the Herbarium.

She corresponded with James Franklin Collins, and has added items to the National Museum of Natural History.

Death and legacy 
Miller died on June 2, 1920, in Washington, D.C.

References 

1872 births
1920 deaths
Bryologists
20th-century American women scientists
Smithsonian Institution people
Scientists from Washington, D.C.
20th-century American botanists
American women botanists